The Patten Creek Site is prehistoric stone tool fabrication site in Platte County, Wyoming. Primary investigation was undertaken at the site in the 1960s.

The site was placed on the National Register of Historic Places on September 11, 1989.

References

External links
 Patten Creek Site at the Wyoming State Historic Preservation Office

		
National Register of Historic Places in Fremont County, Wyoming
Archaeological sites on the National Register of Historic Places in Wyoming